Zdeněk Čihák (9 February 1933 – 4 April 2015) was a Czech athlete. He competed in the men's discus throw at the 1960 Summer Olympics.

References

1933 births
2015 deaths
Athletes (track and field) at the 1960 Summer Olympics
Czech male discus throwers
Olympic athletes of Czechoslovakia
Athletes from Prague